Chrysoula Goudenoudi (born 28 March 1977), also transliterated as Hrísoula or Khrysoula, is a Greek sprinter. She competed in the women's 4 × 400 metres relay at the 2004 Summer Olympics, along with Hariklia Bouda, Dimitra Dova, and Fani Halkia.

References

External links
 

1977 births
Living people
Athletes (track and field) at the 2000 Summer Olympics
Athletes (track and field) at the 2004 Summer Olympics
Greek female sprinters
Greek female hurdlers
Olympic athletes of Greece
Place of birth missing (living people)
Mediterranean Games bronze medalists for Greece
Mediterranean Games medalists in athletics
Athletes (track and field) at the 2001 Mediterranean Games
People from Kilkis (regional unit)
Sportspeople from Central Macedonia
21st-century Greek women